T7 DNA helicase (gp4) is a hexameric motor protein encoded by T7 phages that uses energy from dTTP hydrolysis to process unidirectionally along single stranded DNA, separating (helicase) the two strands as it progresses. It is also a primase, making short stretches of RNA that initiates DNA synthesis. It forms a complex with T7 DNA polymerase. Its homologs are found in mitochondria (as Twinkle) and chloroplasts.

Crystal structure
The crystal structure was solved to 3.0 Å resolution in 2000, as shown in the figure in the reference.  In (A), notice that the separate subunits appear to be anchored through interactions between an alpha helix and an adjacent subunit.  In (B), there are six sets of three loops.  The red loop, known as loop II, contains three lysine residues and is thought to be involved in binding the ssDNA that is fed through the center of the enzyme.

Mechanism of sequential dTTP hydrolysis
Crampton et al. have proposed a mechanism for the ssDNA-dependent hydrolysis of dTTP by T7 DNA helicase as shown in the figure below.  In their model, protein loops located on each hexameric subunit, each of which contain three lysine residues, sequentially interact with the negatively charged phosphate backbone of ssDNA.  This interaction presumably causes a conformational change in the actively bound subunit, providing for the efficient release of dTDP from its dTTP binding site.  In the process of dTDP release, the ssDNA is transferred to the neighboring subunit, which undergoes a similar process.  Previous studies have already suggested that ssDNA is able to bind to two hexameric subunits simultaneously.

See also 

Helicase

References

External links 
 

Molecular biology
EC 3.6.4
DNA replication
Phage proteins